Leading Scottish legal cases include:

Constitutional and Public Law
 Burmah Oil Co. v Lord Advocate [1965] AC 75
 MacCormick v Lord Advocate 1953 SC 396
 Bannatyne v Overtoun [1904] AC 515
 West v Secretary of State for Scotland 1992 SC 385
Cherry and others v Advocate General for Scotland [2019] CSIH 49, then [2019] UKSC 41

Contract
 Boyd & Forest v Glasgow & South-Western Railway Co. 1912 SC(HL) 93
 Dumbarton Steamboat Co. Ltd. v MacFarlane (1899) 1 F 993
 Hunter v General Accident, Fire and Life Assurance Corpn. 1909 SC(HL) 30
 Jacobsen, Sons & Co. v E Underwood & Son Ltd. (1894) 21 R 654
 Morrisson v Robertson 1908 SC 332
 Morton's Trustees v Aged Christian Friend Society of Scotland (1899) 2 F 82
 Philip & Co. v Knoblauch 1907 SC 994
 Wolf and Wolf v Forfar Potato Co 1984 SLT 100
Smith v Bank of Scotland 1997 SC(HL) 111

Criminal
 Brennan v HM Advocate 1977 JC 38
 Cadder v HM Advocate 2010 UKSC 43
 Cawthorne v HM Advocate 1968 JC 32
 Cinci v HM Advocate 2004
 Crawford v HM Advocate 1950 JC 67
 Drury v HM Advocate 2001 SCCR 583
 HM Advocate v Ross 1991 JC 210
 Jamieson v HM Advocate 1994 SLT 537
 Khaliq v HM Advocate 1984 JC 23
 McKearney v HM Advocate 2004
 HM Advocate v Sheridan and Sheridan 2010
 Smart v HM Advocate 1975 JC 30
 Smith v Donnelly 2001 SLT 1007
 Sutherland v HM Advocate 1994 SLT 634

Delict
Bourhill v Young [1943] AC 92
Donoghue v Stevenson 1932 SC(HL) 31
Hughes v Lord Advocate
Kay's Tutor v Ayrshire & Arran Health Board
Titchener v British Railways Board

Enrichment

 Morgan Guaranty Trust Company of New York v Lothian Regional Council 1995 SC 151
 Shilliday v Smith 1998 SC 725
 Dollar Land (Cumbernauld) Ltd v CIN Properties Ltd 1998 SC(HL) 90

Property

 MacLeod v Kerr 1965 SC 253
 Sharp v Thomson 1997 SC(HL) 66
 The Douglas Case ca 1745  (see Lord Monboddo)

Trusts
 McCaig v University of Glasgow 1907 SC 231

Scottish
 
Scotland law-related lists
College of Justice